Horikoshi is a Japanese surname. Notable people with the surname include:

, Japanese aerospace engineer
, Japanese manga artist
, Japanese voice actress
, Japanese weightlifter

See also
Horikoshi High School, a high school in Nakano, Tokyo, Japan

Japanese-language surnames